Euptera intricata is a butterfly in the family Nymphalidae. It is found in Cameroon.

See also
List of butterflies of Cameroon

References

Endemic fauna of Cameroon
Butterflies described in 1894
Euptera
Butterflies of Africa
 Butt